Alivalam is a village  in the Tiruvarur taluk of Tiruvarur district, Tamil Nadu, India. Formerly this village was called 'Arivalam'.

Demographics 

As of the 2011 Census of India, the total population of the village is 5,785 with 2,896 males 2,889 females.

References 

 

Villages in Tiruvarur district